Eamonn Barry is a former Irish Gaelic football manager from County Meath. He has two sons, they are Andrew and Kevin.

Career
He played on the Meath county team in the eighties. He was a member of the Meath team that annexed the Centenary Cup in 1984. He had great success as manager of Dunshaughlin football club in Meath. He became coach of the Meath team for the 2006 All-Ireland Senior Football Championship, as successor to the long-time manager Sean Boylan. The team won the O' Byrne Cup after beating Offaly in Navan. After a County Board meeting, Barry was replaced by Colm Coyle as Meath manager on 11 September 2006. His response was 'I'm not a bit surprised. I've been well aware of the situation for the past couple of months'.
He is the current Meath County Coaching Officer, and has been involved with Meath Development squads as Joint Manager, 2014 (Meath U14) and Selector 2015 (Meath U15) since 2013.

References
http://www.rte.ie/sport/2006/0108/obyrne.html
http://www.irishtimes.com/newspaper/sport/2006/0224/1140626815662.html
https://web.archive.org/web/20070506013002/http://www.rte.ie/sport/2006/0912/meath.html

Year of birth missing (living people)
Living people
Gaelic football managers
Meath inter-county Gaelic footballers